Tugela is a river in KwaZulu-Natal Province, South Africa

Tugela may also refer to:
 Tugela (horse), a racehorse
 Tugela, KwaZulu-Natal, a town in South Africa
 Lamoria or Tugela, a snout moth genus